Kommissar may refer to:

Commissar, a Communist political officer
Commissar (film), a 1967 Soviet film
Kommissar X, German crime fiction series of books from the Pabel Moewig publishing house
"Der Kommissar" (song), a song originally recorded by Falco in 1981 and covered in 1982 by After the Fire
Der Kommissar (album), a 1982 compilation album by After the Fire
Der Kommissar (TV series), a German television series originally broadcast from 1969 to 1976
Kommissar Hjuler (b. 1967), a German sound recordist, visual artist, film maker, and police officer

See also 
Commissioner